Chile participated at the 2017 Summer Universiade, in Taipei, Taiwan with 62 competitors in 7 sports.

Competitors

Athletics

Track Events

Field Events

Basketball

Women's Tournament 

Group Stage

|}

9th-16th place game

13th-16th place game

13th place game

Judo

References 

2017 in Chilean sport
Nations at the 2017 Summer Universiade
2017